Linsleyonides is a genus of beetles in the family Cerambycidae, containing the following species:

 Linsleyonides albomaculatus (Champlain & Knull, 1922)
 Linsleyonides chemsaki Skiles, 1985
 Linsleyonides portoricensis (Fisher, 1932)

References

Elaphidiini